Maple Mountain is a mountain on Vancouver Island in British Columbia, Canada. The mountain is located on the northern side of Maple Bay in North Cowichan, just NE of the city of Duncan.

There is a marked hiking trail that goes up Maple Mountain and affords great views of the water, Salt Spring Island and the distant snowy peaks of the mainland. To get to the trailhead, follow Osborne Bay Road north toward Crofton and turn right on Chilco Road. Follow Chilco to the very end and park there. Walk past the yellow gate. Blue flagging tape marks the trail, which is well maintained.

References

Mountains of British Columbia under 1000 metres
Vancouver Island Ranges